Edward James Conway Donavon (31 May 1872 – 1951) was an Irish cricketer. He made his debut for the Ireland cricket team against South Africa in June 1904 and went on to play for them on four occasions, his last match coming against Yorkshire in May 1907.

Of his matches for Ireland, just once had first-class status, his last match against Yorkshire in May 1907. In all matches for Ireland, he scored 69 runs at an average of 34.50, with a top score of 38 against Cambridge University in July 1904. He took four wickets at an average of 29.75, with his best bowling figures of 2/17 also coming against Cambridge University.

His son Robert also represented Ireland at cricket.

References

1872 births
1951 deaths
Cricketers from Dublin (city)
Irish cricketers